Cakka Nuraga (born as Cakka Kawekas Nuraga in Tangerang, Indonesia on ) is an Indonesian musician, singer and guitarist. Singing since the age of eight, he began his musical career by singing jingles and by appearing in a televised music competition in Indonesia.

Biography

Early life
Cakka Nuraga was born on August 18, 1998. He had been living in Jakarta. Graduated from Bintang 2 Tebet Kindergarten and continued his education in Tebet Timur Primary School. Afterwards, he was moving from Jakarta to Yogyakarta joined his father and older brother and continue his education in Yogyakarta. He then graduated from Serayu Yogyakarta Primary School and stay living in Yogyakarta until now.

Career beginnings
In 2008 Cakka Nuraga was invited by Eross Chandra, an Indonesian guitarist from a band named Sheila on 7 to sing jingles. In October 2008, Cakka took part in a huge televised music competition in Indonesia named 'Idola Cilik'. It made him popular in Indonesia, although he was eliminated as 6th position. He continued his career, and signed a professional contract with an artist management company, Star Media Nusantara. Under the stage name "Cakka Idola Cilik", he released a compilation album with All Idola Cilik's finalists in 2008. Cakka had been starring on Indonesian sinetron (TV series) titled Dewi, as Young Andre. He also frequently took journeys around Indonesia to meet his fans.

The Finest Tree (2012–present)
After his contract with former management finished, he was engaged to Miggy, he formed his new indie management company. In the last year of 2012, alongside his brother they formed a music duo named The Finest Tree. Members of The Finest Tree are Nuraga Brothers, Cakka and Elang. They recently have been released their debut album, Album Hijau. And have been busy promoting their music. Nuraga hopes will inspire listeners everywhere. Album hijau have 5 songs with the main single "Lupa Bawa Nyali". The Finest Tree's career has begun since their song featured as a soundtrack for Indonesian Movie "Cinta Tapi Beda". They sing "Melebur Beda" as main soundtrack for that movie. With The Finest Tree, Cakka left "Idola Cilik" as his stage name and for future career he use "Cakka The Finest Tree" as his new stage name.
As August 2014, Cakka and The Finest Tree signed a contract with Universal Music Indonesia, member of Universal Music Group. They released an introduction single "Kau dan Aku" in October 2014. "Kau dan Aku" topped the chart of many popular radios' music programme nationwide.

Musical style and performance
Musically, Nuraga's sound reflects genres of pop, rock and blues. He points to American musician/singer-songwriter, John Mayer, as one of his main inspirations and reasons for his passion for music.

Discography

Singles

Album
 Album Hijau The Finest Tree (2012) as The Finest Tree's Member.

Filmography
 Dewi (2009) as Young Andre
 Cinta Tapi Beda (2012) as The Finest Tree (soundtrack)

Ads
 Filler Dettol
 Tulipware Catalog

Awards and nominations

References

External links
  Profile at KapanLagi
  Profile at TC-Helicon
 
 
 

1998 births
21st-century Indonesian male singers
Indonesian child singers
Indonesian pop singers
Living people